Chaotian is a northern, mostly rural, county-level district of Guangyuan, Sichuan Province, China.

External links

Districts of Sichuan
Guangyuan